Victor Mikhailovich Kalashnikov (16 July 1942 – 27 March 2018) was a Russian small arms designer known for developing the PP-19 Bizon machine pistols.

Early life and education
Kalashnikov was born 16 July 1942 in Kazakh SSR, Soviet Union, the son of small arms designer Mikhail Kalashnikov and Ekaterina Viktorovna Kalashnikova.

Victor graduated in 1966 from a mechanical institute in Izhevsk in the Soviet Union.

Career
Kalashnikov began his weapon designing career in 1966 by conducting a series of tests of the AK-47 and summarizing the factors that affect its stability, durability, and reliability. He was then involved in the development of self-loading hunting rifles.

He designed a number of parts and components and participated in developing self-loading hunting rifles and Kalashnikov machine guns. He led a group which designed the Bizon and Vityaz-SN machine pistols.

Personal life
Kalashnikov had two sons, Mikhail and Aleksandr. He died 27 March 2018 at age 75 in Izhevsk, Russia.

References

External links
 Kalashnikov.com

1942 births
2018 deaths
Firearm designers
Weapons scientists and engineers
Russian inventors
Russian engineers
People from Izhevsk